Svetlana Alekseyevna Smirnova (née Veresova) (born 10 March 1962 in Pskov) is a Russian sport shooter. She won two medals (silver and bronze), as a member of the Soviet Union shooting team, at the 1987 ISSF World Shooting Championships in Budapest, Hungary, and at the 1990 ISSF World Shooting Championships in Moscow, Russia. She also captured a total of 26 medals (8 gold, 10 silver, 8 bronze), and set a world record of 493 points (1998 in Munich) at the ISSF World Cup.

At age thirty-four, Smirnova made her official debut for the 1996 Summer Olympics in Atlanta, where she placed fifteenth in the women's 25 m pistol, with a score of 576 points, tying her position with four other shooters including Mongolia's Munkhbayar Dorjsuren and Azerbaijan's Irada Ashumova.

At the 2000 Summer Olympics in Sydney, Smirnova reached the final of the women's 10 m air pistol; however, she missed out of the medal by three tenths of a point (0.3) behind Australia's Annemarie Forder (484.0), with a total score of 483.7 points (384 in the preliminary rounds and 99.7 in the final).

Eight years after competing in her last Olympics, Smirnova qualified for the women's 10 m air pistol, as a 46-year-old, at the 2008 Summer Olympics in Beijing. She finished only in ninth place, and thereby missed out of the final by one point behind Finland's Mira Nevansuu, for a total score of 383 targets.

References

External links
NBC 2008 Olympics profile

Russian female sport shooters
Soviet female sport shooters
Living people
Olympic shooters of Russia
ISSF pistol shooters
World record holders in shooting
Shooters at the 1996 Summer Olympics
Shooters at the 2000 Summer Olympics
Shooters at the 2008 Summer Olympics
Sportspeople from Pskov
1962 births